Joachim Henry Appeldorn (May 18, 1885 – July 7, 1972) was an American businessman and politician.

Appeldorn was born in Paullina, O'Brien County, Iowa. He moved to a farm with his wife and family to Pipestone, Pipestone County, Minnesota. He was the president and land appraiser of the United States Federal Land Baker Association of Pipestone County. Appeldorn served on the Pipestone Town Board for twelve years. Appeldorn served in the Minnesota House of Representatives from 1947 until 1954.

References

1885 births
1972 deaths
People from O'Brien County, Iowa
People from Pipestone, Minnesota
Businesspeople from Minnesota
Minnesota city council members
Members of the Minnesota House of Representatives